Sadler is an unincorporated community in Grayson County, in the U.S. state of Kentucky.

History
A post office called Sadler was established in 1892. E. Garner Sadler, the first postmaster, gave the community its name.

References

Unincorporated communities in Grayson County, Kentucky
Unincorporated communities in Kentucky